The 120 members of the thirteenth Knesset were elected on 23 June 1992. The breakdown by party was as follows:
Labor Party: 44
Likud: 32
Meretz: 12
Tzomet: 8
National Religious Party: 6
Shas: 6
United Torah Judaism: 4
Hadash: 3
Moledet: 3
Arab Democratic Party: 2

List of members

Replacements

External links
Members of the Thirteenth Knesset Knesset website

 
13